The Napier-Bentley is a vintage racing car; a one-off special built in 1972 by David Llewellyn and Peter Morley. It was based on a chassis constructed from two 4-litre Bentley sideframe members, shortened and modified to a 10 foot wheelbase. The Napier-Bentley is seen at historic racing events mostly in the United Kingdom but has been used at European events.

With its red bodywork and Napier-Railton-esque grille, it is spectacular and entertaining in action. Being a W12, the engine has three banks of four very large stub exhausts, one of which points straight out of the side of the car. The sound of the car has been likened to a World War I biplane or cluster or mortar bombs going off. Due to the immense torque of the engine (c.1,400 ft-lbs), the rear tyres can be made to produce clouds of smoke whenever the car is launched, while the exhausts produce sparks, flames and smoke.
 
During the 30 years that he owned the car Peter Morley and his son, Clive Morley, raced the car frequently until it was sold in 1999. Peter and Clive Morley, as well as Clive's two sons, are still active in racing vintage Bentleys. Since 1999, the car has been owned by Chris Williams, and coveted by his daughter, Rachael, who wishes to race it as well. Chris Williams later constructed another similar vintage special, the Packard-Bentley.

Possible Sources
In the specialized press : https://www.motorsportmagazine.com/archive/article/november-2004/103/bentley-napier
An appearance : https://www.chateauimpneyhillclimb.com/blog/chris-williams-napier-bentley-video/
More pics on Bentley's vintage cars site : http://www.vintagebentleys.org/specials/0001.php

 
Racing cars
Napier Lion
Cars powered by aircraft engines